Dysprosium oxide (Dy2O3) is a sesquioxide compound of the rare earth metal dysprosium. It is a pastel yellowish-greenish, slightly hygroscopic powder having specialized uses in ceramics, glass, phosphors, lasers, as a Faraday rotator and dysprosium metal halide lamps.

It can react with acids to produce the corresponding dysprosium(III) salts:

Dy2O3 + 6 HCl → 2 DyCl3 + 3 H2O

References

Dysprosium compounds
Sesquioxides